Aromatherapy is based on the usage of aromatic materials including essential oils and other aroma compounds, with claims for improving psychological and physical well-being. It is offered as a complementary therapy or as a form of alternative medicine, the first meaning alongside standard treatments, the second instead of conventional, evidence-based treatments.

Aromatherapists, people who specialize in the practice of aromatherapy, utilize blends of supposedly therapeutic essential oils that can be used as topical application, massage, inhalation or water immersion. There is no good medical evidence that aromatherapy can either prevent, treat or cure any disease. Placebo-controlled trials are difficult to design as the point of aromatherapy is the smell of the products. There is disputed evidence that it may be effective in combating postoperative nausea and vomiting.

History 

The use of essential oils for therapeutic, spiritual, hygienic and ritualistic purposes goes back to ancient civilizations including the Indians, Chinese, Egyptians, Greeks, and Romans who used them in cosmetics, perfumes and drugs. Oils were used for aesthetic pleasure and in the beauty industry. They were a luxury item and a means of payment. It was believed the essential oils increased the shelf life of wine and improved the taste of food.

Oils are described by Dioscorides, along with beliefs of the time regarding their healing properties, in his De Materia Medica, written in the first century. Distilled cedarwood oil was used by the ancient Egyptians, and the process of distilling essential oils like rose essence was refined by the 11th century Persian scholar Ibn Sina. Hildegard of Bingen used distilled lavender oil for medicinal treatments in the 12th century, and by the 15th century, oils were commonly distilled from various plant sources.

An English version was published in 1993. In 1910, Gattefossé burned a hand very badly and later claimed he treated it effectively with lavender oil.

A French surgeon, pioneered the medicinal uses of essential oils, which he used as antiseptics in the treatment of wounded soldiers during World War II.

Choice and purchase

Aromatherapy products, and essential oils, in particular, may be regulated differently depending on their intended use. A product that is marketed with a therapeutic use in the US is regulated by the US Food & Drug Administration (FDA); a product with a cosmetic use is not (unless information shows that "it is unsafe when consumers use it according to directions on the label, or in the customary or expected way, or if it is not labeled properly".) The US Federal Trade Commission (FTC) regulates any aromatherapy advertising claims.

There are no standards for determining the quality of essential oils in the United States; while the term "therapeutic grade" is in use, it does not have a regulatory meaning.

Analysis using gas chromatography and mass spectrometry has been used to identify bioactive compounds in essential oils. These techniques are able to measure the levels of components to a few parts per billion. This does not make it possible to determine whether each component is natural or whether a poor oil has been "improved" by the addition of synthetic aromachemicals but the latter is often signalled by the minor impurities present. For example, linalool made in plants will be accompanied by a small amount of hydro-linalool whilst synthetic linalool has traces of dihydro-linalool.

Effectiveness 
There is no good medical evidence that aromatherapy can prevent or cure any disease. However, for cancer patients, aromatherapy tests showed mixed results in lowering anxiety and depression symptoms. In 2015, the Australian Government's Department of Health published the results of a review of alternative therapies that sought to determine if any were suitable for being covered by health insurance; aromatherapy was one of 17 therapies evaluated for which no clear evidence of effectiveness was found.

Evidence for the efficacy of aromatherapy in treating medical conditions is poor, with a particular lack of studies employing rigorous methodology. A number of systematic reviews have studied the clinical effectiveness of aromatherapy in respect to pain management in labor, the treatment of post-operative nausea and vomiting, managing challenging behaviors in people suffering from dementia and symptom relief in cancer. However, some studies have come to the conclusion that while it does improve the patient's mood, there is no conclusive evidence on how it works with pain management. Studies have been inconclusive because no straightforward evidence exists. All of these reviews report a lack of evidence on the effectiveness of aromatherapy.

Safety concerns

Aromatherapy carries a number of risks of adverse effects and with this in consideration, combined with the lack of evidence of its therapeutic benefit, makes the practice of questionable worth.

Many studies exploring the concerns that essential oils are highly concentrated and can irritate the skin when used in undiluted form often referred to as neat application. Therefore, they are normally diluted with a carrier oil for topical application such as jojoba oil, olive oil, sweet almond oil or coconut oil. Phototoxic reactions may occur with many cold pressed citrus peel oils such as lemon or lime. Also, many essential oils have chemical components that are sensitisers (meaning that they will, after a number of uses, cause reactions on the skin and more so in the rest of the body). Chemical composition of essential oils could be affected by herbicides if the original plants are cultivated versus wild-harvested. Some oils can be toxic to some domestic animals, with cats being particularly prone.

Most oils can be toxic to humans as well. A report of three cases documented gynecomastia in prepubertal boys who were exposed to topical lavender and tea tree oils. The Aromatherapy Trade Council of the UK issued a rebuttal. The Australian Tea Tree Association, a group that promotes the interests of Australian tea tree oil producers, exporters and manufacturers issued a letter that questioned the study and called on the New England Journal of Medicine for a retraction. Another article published by a different research group also documented three cases of gynecomastia in prepubertal boys who were exposed to topical lavender oil. A recent research, made by NIEHS scientists and published on Endocrine Society's Journal of Clinical Endocrinology and Metabolism, concluded that persistent exposure to lavender products is associated with premature breast development in girls and "that chemicals in lavender oil and tea tree oil are potential endocrine disruptors with varying effects on receptors for two hormones — estrogen and androgen".

Essential oils can be extremely toxic when ingested or absorbed internally. Doses as low as 2 ml have been reported to cause clinically significant symptoms and severe poisoning can occur after ingestion of as little as 4 ml. A few reported cases of toxic reactions like liver damage and seizures have occurred after ingestion of sage, hyssop, thuja and cedar oils. Accidental ingestion may happen when oils are not kept out of reach of children. As with any bioactive substance, an essential oil that may be safe for the general public could still pose hazards for pregnant and lactating women.

Oils both ingested and applied to the skin can potentially have negative interactions with conventional medicine. For example, the topical use of methyl salicylate-heavy oils like wintergreen may cause bleeding in users taking the anticoagulant warfarin.

In late 2021, an aromatherapy spray was recalled after it was found to be contaminated with Burkholderia pseudomallei, the bacteria that causes melioidosis, which led to four cases of the disease and two deaths.

See also
 Aromachologist
 List of unproven and disproven cancer treatments

References

External links

 Aromatherapy and Essential Oils – health professional
 patient PDQ (Physician Data Query) summaries from the National Cancer Institute
 

 
Herbalism
Mind–body interventions
Fringe science
Alternative medicine